During the 1972–73 English football season, Leicester City F.C. competed in the Football League First Division.

Season summary
The 1972–73 season was a disappointing one for the Foxes, finishing in 16th place in the final standings. Their only highlights during the season were a 3-2 win over champions Liverpool at Filbert Street with a Keith Weller hat-trick after being 2-0 down and also holding them to a 0-0 draw at Anfield on the final day. Results generally though throughout were poor and Leicester at one point were bottom at end of November. A lack of goals as well were hard to come by but their tight defence with the experience of Cross and Manley proved dividends and the Foxes ensured survival with a solid run of just 2 defeats in their final 12 league games.

Final league table

Results
Leicester City's score comes first

Legend

Football League First Division

FA Cup

League Cup

Texaco Cup

Squad

References

Leicester City F.C. seasons
Leicester City